Indrek Tart (born 2 May 1946 in Tallinn) is an Estonian sociologist, essay writer, poet, and culture researcher. His wife is :et:Aili Aarelaid-Tart.

References

Estonian male poets
1946 births
Living people
Writers from Tallinn
International Writing Program alumni
20th-century Estonian poets
21st-century Estonian poets
Estonian sociologists